The UConn Huskies football team has represented the University of Connecticut in National Collegiate Athletic Association (NCAA) football since the team's founding in 1896.  The Huskies have played in six post-season bowl games, all following their transition from  Division I-AA to Division I-A in 2000.  UConn's longest bowl invitation streak is four seasons, from 2007 to 2010.

The UConn Huskies football program enjoyed its greatest period of success during the first head coaching tenure of Randy Edsall (1999–2011).  Prior to his hiring, UConn only appeared in two post-season football contests, during the 1998 NCAA Division I-AA playoffs.  Under Edsall, the Huskies played in five bowl games including one Bowl Championship Series (BCS) bowl game.  The team also shared two Big East Conference championships and were ranked at various times in the Associated Press (AP), Coaches', and Harris polls, as well as the BCS standings.  Subsequent to Edsall's first departure after the 2010 season, UConn has played in only two bowl games: in 2015 and 2022.

Multiple future National Football League (NFL) draft picks have had superior performances for the Huskies in bowl games, including the first Connecticut player ever to be picked in the first round of the draft: running back Donald Brown.  Brown, the all-time leading rusher in UConn bowl game history with 333 yards on 42 carries, made appearances in the 2007 Meineke Car Care Bowl and the 2009 International Bowl, where he was named most valuable player (MVP) after rushing for 261 yards and a touchdown—the best single-game rushing performance in Connecticut bowl game history. Dan Orlovsky earned MVP honors for his UConn-bowl single-game-record passing performance in 2004; he was drafted in the fifth round of the 2005 NFL Draft by the Detroit Lions.  Wide receiver Marcus Easley was drafted in the fourth round of the 2010 NFL Draft by the Buffalo Bills.

The Huskies' first post-season bowl game was in 2004, when they participated in the 2004 Motor City Bowl in Detroit, Michigan on December 27 against the Toledo Rockets.  The most recent UConn bowl game occurred on December 19, 2022, when the Huskies faced the Marshall Thundering Herd in the 2022 Myrtle Beach Bowl.  A loss in that game brought Connecticut to an overall bowl record of three wins and four losses, a .429 winning percentage.

*This bowl game's name has changed one or moretimes since UConn's last appearance.  See the linkedarticles for the name change history.

Summary table
 

Attendance records are correct as of the end of the 2022 NCAA Division I FBS football season.

Game summaries

2004 Motor City Bowl

The first bowl game in Connecticut history came at the conclusion of the 2004 NCAA Division I-A football season, the first year UConn was a full member of the Big East Conference for football.  The season before, UConn finished with a 9–3 overall record, but did not receive a bowl invitation due to the lack of conference affiliation.  Even as a full member of the Big East, UConn was shut out of the conference-affiliated bowl picture.  Pittsburgh, Boston College (in its last year in the Big East before leaving to join the Atlantic Coast Conference (ACC)), West Virginia, and Syracuse all finished ahead of the Huskies in a four-way tie for first place; they filled four of the five conference bowl slots.  The remaining slot was filled by Notre Dame, who was not a member of the Big East Conference for football but had a contract allowing them to be selected in place of a Big East team.  Fortunately for UConn, the Big Ten did not have enough bowl-eligible teams to fill all of its contracted bowl slots, allowing the Motor City Bowl to pick the Huskies.  UConn's opponent would be the Toledo Rockets of the Mid-American Conference (MAC), who earned their berth by winning the 2004 MAC Championship Game.

The 2004 Motor City Bowl was played on December 27, 2004 at Ford Field in Detroit, Michigan. The game was anticipated to be a high-scoring affair, with both teams' quarterbacks among the top seven nationally in passing that year.  However, Toledo quarterback Bruce Gradkowski had broken his throwing hand during the MAC Championship Game and was largely ineffective; he was only able to complete six of twelve passes for 43 yards and did not play in the second half.  Connecticut scored what was then a Motor City Bowl-record 17 points in the first quarter, from a field goal, a 32-yard touchdown pass from quarterback Dan Orlovsky to wide receiver Jason Williams on a 4th-down-and-6 play, and a 68-yard punt return for a touchdown by Larry Taylor.  In the second quarter, after Toledo finally scored on a one-yard rushing touchdown by Gradkowski, UConn added 13 more points to the scoreboard.  The Rockets would not come back in the second half; the Huskies won the game 39–10.  Orlovsky was named the game's most valuable player (MVP); he completed 20 of 41 passes for 239 yards and two touchdowns.

2007 Meineke Car Care Bowl

Following two seasons where they struggled to replace graduated quarterback Dan Orlovsky and lost more games than they won, Connecticut returned to bowl eligibility in 2007, finishing the regular season with a record of 9–3 and claiming a share of the Big East Conference championship.  Fellow conference co-champion West Virginia, who beat the Huskies 66–21 that year, earned the Big East's automatic BCS bowl bid; UConn had to settle for the Meineke Car Care Bowl.  Their opponent was Wake Forest, the previous season's Atlantic Coast Conference (ACC) champion.

In the first half, Connecticut took a 10–0 lead off of a 68-yard punt return for a touchdown by Larry Taylor and a field goal.  Wake Forest dominated the second half, taking the lead late in the third quarter off of 20-yard touchdown pass from quarterback Riley Skinner to tight end John Tereshinski. The Demon Deacons added ten more points in the fourth quarter off of a field goal and a nine-yard touchdown run by running back Micah Andrews.  The final score was 24–10 in favor of Wake Forest.  UConn earned only nine first downs and failed to score an offensive touchdown.

2009 International Bowl

Connecticut was selected as a participant in the 2009 International Bowl following a 7–5 regular season where they won their first five games, only to lose five of their last seven contests. Facing the Huskies were the Buffalo Bulls with a regular season record of 8–5, highlighted by an upset win over then-No. 12 and undefeated Ball State in the 2008 MAC Championship Game.  This was the second time, after the 2004 Motor City Bowl, that the Huskies faced the MAC champions in a bowl game.

The Huskies, led by running back Donald Brown's 208 yards rushing, dominated the first half statistically, but found themselves down 20–10 midway through the second quarter due to giving up six fumbles, five of which were recovered by Buffalo.  UConn would close the gap to 20–17 by halftime, and take the lead for good late in the third quarter off of a 4-yard touchdown pass from quarterback Tyler Lorenzen to tight end Steve Brouse.  The Connecticut victory was sealed when, late in the fourth quarter, Buffalo quarterback Drew Willy threw a pass that was intercepted by UConn safety Dahna Deleston and returned 100 yards for a touchdown, making the final score 38–20 in favor of the Huskies.

Brown was named player of the game.  He finished with 261 rushing yards and one touchdown; his 2,083 rushing yards for the 2008 season was best in the NCAA.  Following the game, Brown declared his eligibility for the 2009 NFL Draft; he would become the first Connecticut player ever drafted in the first round.  Three other UConn players were drafted in the second round.

2010 PapaJohns.com Bowl

Connecticut was selected as a participant in the 2010 PapaJohns.com Bowl following a tumultuous 7–5 regular season, marked by the loss of five games by a total of fifteen points between them, a double-overtime victory at Notre Dame, and the murder of cornerback Jasper Howard.  Facing the Huskies were the South Carolina Gamecocks with the same regular season record of 7–5, highlighted by wins over then-No. 4 Mississippi and then-No. 15 Clemson.  This game would be the first time UConn would face a Southeastern Conference opponent in a bowl game.

Connecticut took control of the contest in the first quarter, scoring on a one-handed 37-yard touchdown reception by wide receiver Kashif Moore and then, after South Carolina failed to convert a fourth down play at their own 32-yard line, kicking a 33-yard field goal to take a 10–0 lead.  Running back Andre Dixon scored on a 10-yard rush early in the fourth quarter to put the game away for UConn; the only Gamecock touchdown, on a two-yard run by Brian Maddox, came after the game had effectively been decided.  The final score was 20–7 in favor of the Huskies.

Dixon was named player of the game, finishing with 126 rushing yards and one touchdown.  Connecticut wide receiver Marcus Easley and South Carolina linebacker Eric Norwood were among four players from the two teams to be selected in the 2010 NFL Draft.

2011 Fiesta Bowl

Connecticut was selected to play in the 2011 Fiesta Bowl, their only Bowl Championship Series (BCS) appearance, following an 8–4 regular season where they split the Big East conference championship with Pittsburgh and West Virginia.  The Huskies earned the BCS berth by beating both West Virginia and Pittsburgh in consecutive weeks during the regular season.  They faced the Oklahoma Sooners, who beat Nebraska to win the 2010 Big 12 Championship Game.  The game marked the first matchup between the Huskies and a Big 12 team in a bowl game, and the first meeting ever in football between Connecticut and Oklahoma.

Oklahoma converted their first two possessions into touchdowns to take a 14–0 lead at the end of the first quarter.  The Huskies struck back as cornerback Dwayne Gratz intercepted a pass from Sooner quarterback Landry Jones and returned it for a touchdown; after multiple field goals, the score was 20–10 in Oklahoma's favor at halftime.  In the second half, Oklahoma added two more touchdowns on a 59-yard pass and an interception return for a touchdown to extend their lead to 34–10; Connecticut responded by returning the ensuing kickoff for a touchdown.  Although the Huskies would kick another field goal to reduce their deficit to 34–20, the Sooners would put the game away in the fourth quarter, scoring two more touchdowns to make the final score 48–20.  Connecticut failed to score a single offensive touchdown in the game.

Following the game, Randy Edsall left UConn to become head coach of the Maryland Terrapins football team.  He was replaced by Paul Pasqualoni.

2015 St. Petersburg Bowl

UConn would fail to become bowl-eligible during Pasqualoni's three-year tenure as head coach.  His replacement, Bob Diaco, following a 2–10 season in 2014, would return the Huskies to bowl eligibility in his second year with the team.  The Huskies finished the regular season with a 6–6 record in 2015, highlighted by a 20–17 victory over the otherwise-undefeated Houston Cougars.  Connecticut accepted a bid to play in the 2015 St. Petersburg Bowl against the Marshall Thundering Herd, who were looking to finish with at least ten wins for the third consecutive season.

Marshall scored first, on a 16-yard pass from quarterback Chase Litton to tight end Ryan Yurachek.  UConn responded on the next drive, scoring on an eight-yard touchdown run by Ron Johnson.  The Thundering Herd added two field goals, the second as the second quarter clock expired, to make the score 13–7 at halftime.  Marshall's first three drives in the second half ended in a turnover on downs after going for it on 4th-and-2 from the Connecticut 17-yard line, a missed 43-yard field goal attempt, and an interception.  Despite this, the Huskies were unable to make progress against the Herd's defense, scoring only a single field goal to cut the lead to 13–10 at the end of the third quarter.  Marshall added a field goal late in the fourth quarter; after UConn's last drive ended with an incomplete pass, Marshall was able to run out the clock. The final score was 16–10 in the Herd's favor.

2022 Myrtle Beach Bowl

Following a 3–9 third season with the Huskies, Diaco was terminated at the end of the 2016 season.  His replacement, Randy Edsall, returning to the program after six years, would not find similar success in his second go-around.  After three straight losing campaigns and a season cancelled by the COVID-19 pandemic in 2020, Edsall elected to retire after a 0–2 start in 2021.

To replace Edsall, UConn hired Jim L. Mora.  In his first season with the team, Mora would lead the Huskies to a surprising 6–6 regular season record, highlighted by an upset victory over then-No. 19 Liberty.  Bowl-eligible for the first time since 2015, UConn was selected to play in the 2022 Myrtle Beach Bowl against Marshall, in a rematch of their last bowl game.

The Huskies would find themselves down early, fumbling on their first offensive play to set up a Herd touchdown pass and then throwing an interception returned for a touchdown later in the quarter.  After a UConn missed field goal and a Marshall touchdown run, the score was 21–0 at halftime.  Marshall would extend their lead in the third quarter to 28–0, before Connecticut responded with two touchdown runs by Victor Rosa that narrowed Marshall's advantage to 28–14.  The Huskies were unable to close the gap any further; after Marshall's Micah Abraham intercepted a pass in the end zone late in the fourth quarter, the Herd were able to run out the clock, leaving the final score 28–14 in Marshall's favor.

Individual statistics
The below tables list the top five (including ties) performers by yardage in the indicated statistic.

References for the below statistics:

Single game

Passing

Rushing

Receiving

Bowl game career

Passing

Rushing

Receiving

Defensive single game
The below table lists the top five (including ties) performers by most tackles made.

See also
Glossary of American football

Notes

References

UConn

UConn Huskies bowl games